Dravidian studies (also Dravidology) is the academic field devoted to the Dravidian languages, literature, and culture. It is a superset of Tamil studies and a subset of South Asian studies.

Early missionaries

The 16th to 18th century missionaries who wrote Tamil grammars or lexica include Henrique Henriques, Bartholomaeus Ziegenbalg and Constantino Giuseppe Beschi.

Dravidian language hypothesis
The recognition that the Dravidian languages were a phylogenetic unit separate from Indo-European dates to 1816, and was presented by F. W. Ellis, Collector of Madras, at the College of Fort St. George.

Nineteenth-century experts
The 19th century contributors to the field of Dravidology were:

Twentieth-century experts

The noted Dravidologists from the twentieth century are:

Contemporary programs

The Dravidian University at Kuppam, Andhra Pradesh
has created Chairs in the names of Western and Dravidian scholars to encourage research in individual Dravidian languages as well as comparative Dravidian studies:
 Bishop Caldwell's Chair for Dravidian Studies
 C. P. Brown's Chair for Telugu Studies
 Kittel Chair for Kannada Studies
 Constantine Beschi Chair for Tamil Studies
 Gundert Chair for Malayalam Studies.

Literature
Robert Caldwell, Comparative Grammar of Dravidian Languages (1856; revised edition 1875).

Thomas R. Trautmann, Languages and nations: the Dravidian proof in colonial Madras, University of California Press, 2006, ISBN University of California Press, 2006.

Film 
The 2021 Indian documentary film Dreaming of Words traces the life and work of Njattyela Sreedharan, a fourth standard drop-out, who compiled a multilingual dictionary connecting four major Dravidian languages Malayalam, Kannada, Tamil and Telugu. Travelling across four states and doing extensive research, he spent twenty five years making this multilingual dictionary.

See also
 Indology
 Proto-Dravidian
 Elamo-Dravidian
 Dreaming of Words

References

External links
Dravidian studies in the Netherlands, IIAS newsletter  (2005) 
Extracts from T.R.Sesha Iyengar's "Dravidian India" by Dr. Samar Abbas, Bhubaneshwar, 4/8/2003
Literary Contributions of select list of Tamil Scholars from Overseas
 Roja Muthiah Research Library

 
Indology